Below are the squads for the Football at the 1991 Southeast Asian Games, hosted by Thailand, which took place between 1 and 14 December 2005.

Group A

Singapore 
Coach: Robin Chan

Thailand 
Coach: Carlos Roberto

Myanmar 
Coach:

Group B

Vietnam 
Coach:  Nguyễn Sỹ Hiển

Malaysia 
Coach:  Rahim Abdullah

Indonesia 
Coach:  Anatoli Polosin

Philippines 
Coach:  Eckhard Krautzun

References 

Football at the 1991 Southeast Asian Games